Jeremy Kleiner (born 1976/1977) is an American film producer. He and his fellow producers won two Academy Awards for Best Picture for the 2013 film 12 Years a Slave and the 2016 film Moonlight.

Biography
Kleiner was born to a Jewish family and is a 1998 graduate of Harvard University, where he won the Detur Book Prize, the Hoopes Prize and was elected Phi Beta Kappa. Kleiner worked as creative executive at Dick and Lauren Shuler Donner's company. In 2003, he joined Plan B Entertainment where he worked his way up from creative executive to producer and then co-president in 2013.

Filmography 
He was a producer in all films unless otherwise noted.

Film

Thanks

Television

Awards and nominations

Academy Awards

AACTA International Awards

AFI Awards

Alliance of Women Film Journalists

American Black Film Festival

Awards Circuit Community Awards

Black Reel Awards

British Academy Film Awards

CinEuphoria Awards

Golden Raspberry Awards

Gotham Awards

Independent Spirit Awards

Italian Online Movie Awards

Online Film & Television Association Awards

Primetime Emmy Awards

Producers Guild of America Awards

References

External links 
 

Living people
20th-century American Jews
Producers who won the Best Picture Academy Award
Filmmakers who won the Best Film BAFTA Award
Golden Globe Award-winning producers
1976 births
Harvard University alumni
21st-century American Jews
American film producers